The Army will continue the development and fielding of an incremental ground tactical network capability to all Army brigade combat teams. This network is a layered system of interconnected computers and software, radios, and sensors within the Brigade Combat Team (BCT). The BCT network is essential to enable Unified Battle Command and will be delivered to the Army's Brigade Combat Teams in increasing capability increments. The first increment is currently finishing SDD developmental and operational testing and will be delivered to Infantry Brigade Combat Teams in the form of Network Integration Kits (B-kits) with E-IBCT.

The soldier at every echelon, from Brigade to Squad, will be connected to the proper sensor data and communication relays to ensure proper battlespace situational awareness.

The Network Integration Kit 
The Network Integration Kit (NIK) is a suite of equipment capable of being installed on many vehicles including HMMWV's and MRAPs. It provides the Network connectivity and battle command software to integrate and fuse sensor data into the common operational picture (COP) displayed on the Force XXI Battle Command Battalion/Brigade and Below (FBCB2). The Network Integration Kit consists of an integrated computer system (ICS) that hosts the Battle Command software and the Systems of Systems Common Operating Environment (SOSCOE) software, along with the JTRS GMR radio to provide the interface to the sensors and unmanned systems, as well as voice and data communications with other vehicles and soldiers.

Soldiers will be able to communicate with the Battalion Tactical Operation Center (TOC), by sending reports on enemy sighting, activity and location utilizing the NIK via the Network allowing for split-time tactical decisions.

Sources 
This article incorporates work from https://web.archive.org/web/20090927002001/http://www.bctmod.army.mil/systems/network/index.html, which is in the public domain as it is a work of the United States Army.

See also 

Military technology